The Chez Jo Goldenberg restaurant attack was a bombing and shooting attack on a Jewish restaurant in the Parisien district of  Marais   on 9 August 1982 carried out by the Palestinian militant Abu Nidal Organization, a group that splintered from PLO.  Two assailants threw a grenade into the dining room, then rushed in and fired machine guns.  They killed six people, including two Americans, Ann Van Zanten, a curator at the Chicago Historical Society, and Grace Cutler, and injured 22 others.  Mrs. Van Zanten's husband, David, an art history professor at Northwestern University, was among the injured. BusinessWeek later said it was "the heaviest toll suffered by Jews in France since World War II." The restaurant closed in 2006 and former owner Jo Goldenberg died in 2014.

Although the Abu Nidal Organization had long been suspected, suspects from the group were only definitively identified 32 years after the attacks, in evidence given by two former Abu Nidal members granted anonymity by French judges.

In December 2020 one of the suspects, Walid Abdulrahman Abou Zayed, was handed over to French police (at a Norwegian airport) and flown to France. He is still in detention as of Q3 2022.

Investigations and arrests
In March 2015, French authorities said that an international arrest warrant had been issued in connection with the case for three men who belonged to the organization. The suspects were identified as living in  Norway, Jordan and Ramallah in the Palestinian territories. Mahmoud Khader Abed, 59, living in Ramallah are still being sought [as of 2022].

In June 2015, a Palestinian named Zuhair Mohammed Hassan Khalid al-Abbasi, also known as "Amiad Atta," was arrested in Jordan, according to the Paris prosecutor's office, which also said that France has requested extradition.  On June 17, Jordan released al-Abbasi on bail.

Walid Abdulrahman Abou Zayed, 56, who has become a Norwegian citizen, is in French custody (as of 2022).

The case against a Palestinian that became a Norwegian citizen

In September 2020, Walid Abdulrahman Abou Zayed, a Norwegian citizen was arrested by Norwegian Police Security Service responding to the international arrest warrant issued by France in 2015,

In December 2020, he was being held at La Sante Prison in Paris. In December 2021, the pre-trial detention was extended for another six months; trial date has not been set (as of Q1 2022).

Media said in February 2022 that the French police's view is that Zayed has not told the truth about his travels in 1982; during one interrogation he said that he had never been to France. In other interrogations he said that he had been to Monte Carlo.

See also
 Irish of Vincennes
 List of attacks attributed to Abu Nidal
 List of terrorist incidents in France
 1982 Berlin restaurant bombing
 September 1982 Paris car bombing
Grand Véfour restaurant bombing

References

4th arrondissement of Paris
1982 in international relations
1982 in Paris
1980s crimes in Paris
1982 mass shootings in Europe
1982 murders in France
20th-century mass murder in France
Abu Nidal attacks
Antisemitic attacks and incidents in Europe
Antisemitism in France
Attacks on buildings and structures in Paris
Attacks on restaurants in Europe
August 1982 crimes
August 1982 events in Europe
Improvised explosive device bombings in 1982
Improvised explosive device bombings in Paris
Jews and Judaism in Paris
Mass murder in 1982
Mass murder in Paris
Mass shootings in France
Palestinian terrorist incidents in Europe
Terrorist incidents in France in 1982
Building bombings in France